Southeastern Baptist Theological Seminary (SEBTS) is a Baptist theological institute in Wake Forest, North Carolina. It is affiliated with the Southern Baptist Convention. in Wake Forest, North Carolina.  It was created in 1950 to meet a need in the SBC's East Coast region. It was voted into existence on May 19, 1950, at the SBC annual meeting and began offering classes in the fall of 1951 on the original campus of Wake Forest University (then Wake Forest College) in Wake Forest, North Carolina. The undergraduate program is called The College at Southeastern. The current president is Daniel L. Akin.

It has been accredited by the Association of Theological Schools in the United States and Canada (ATS) since 1958 and by the Commission on Colleges of the Southern Association of Colleges and Schools (SACS) since 1978.

History 

The seminary, under the presidency of Sydnor L. Stealey, began offering classes in 1951 on the campus of Wake Forest College. When the college moved in 1956 to Winston-Salem, North Carolina, Southeastern acquired the whole campus. In 1963, Stealey retired and Olin T. Binkley was elected the new president. Under his leadership, the Bachelor of Divinity (B.Div.) degree transitioned into the Master of Divinity (M.Div.) degree, and the Master of Religious Education (MRE) and the Doctor of Ministry (D.Min.) degrees were instituted.  Binkley was also an equal-rights supporter. He retired in 1974 and was succeeded by W. Randall Lolley. During his presidency, enrollment at the seminary more than doubled.  Under demands from an increasingly fundamentalist Board of Trustees, Lolley resigned in 1987 and was succeeded the following year by Lewis A. Drummond. Billy Graham attended Drummond's inauguration. Drummond's time was marked by a large amount of turnover in the faculty and a decline in enrollment. He retired in the spring of 1992.  The fifth elected president of Southeastern was L. Paige Patterson, a theological and political conservative, who reorganized the seminary on conservative lines, as well as upgrading degree programs and introducing doctoral degrees. Patterson's years at the school were another season of growth. He took the same position at Southwestern Baptist Theological Seminary in 2004, being replaced by Daniel L. Akin, the school's current president, who has taken a similar approach.

Lea Laboratory was built in 1887–88, and was listed on the National Register of Historic Places in 1975.

The seminary was granted an exception to Title IX in 2016, allowing it to legally discriminate against LGBT students for religious reasons.

Notable alumni

 Addie Elizabeth Davis, first woman ordained as a Southern Baptist pastor.
Will Graham (evangelist), grandson of Billy Graham and American evangelist
Mark Harris, former Republican candidate for 9th district congressional seat in 2018 election that was not certified due to irregularities and allegations of fraud by Harris campaign advisors  
Elizabeth Mburu, Kenyan biblical scholar, first female PhD graduate
Johnny Hunt, former president of the Southern Baptist Convention and pastor of First Baptist, Woodstock, Georgia.
Jeff Struecker, former Army Ranger portrayed in Black Hawk Down

References

External links
 Official website

Baptist Christianity in North Carolina
Educational institutions established in 1950
Seminaries and theological colleges in North Carolina
Universities and colleges accredited by the Southern Association of Colleges and Schools
Universities and colleges in the Research Triangle
Wake Forest, North Carolina
Universities and colleges in Wake County, North Carolina
1950 establishments in North Carolina
Baptist seminaries and theological colleges affiliated with the Southern Baptist Convention